Hire Kotnekal is a village in the Manvi taluk of Raichur district in the Indian state of Karnataka. Hire Kotnekal is located west to Manvi town. Hire Kotnekal lies on road connecting Manvi and  Sindhanur.

Demographics
As of 2001 India census, Hire Kotnekal had a population of 7662 with 3835 males and 3827 females.

See also

Kalmala
Devadurga
Lingasugur
Sindhanur
Raichur

References

External links
www.raichur.nic.in

Villages in Raichur district